Jacques Rougeot (13 June 1938 – 19 July 2021) was a French literary critic and political activist.

Biography
After earning a doctorate in literature in 1978, Rougeot was a French professor at Paris-Sorbonne University. He was one of the founders and served as President of Union Nationale Inter-universitaire from 1969 to 2009. He was also founding President of the Initiative and Liberty Movement.

During the 1980s, Rougeot wrote for the Club de l'Horloge's newspaper, Contrepoint.

Jacques Rougeot died on 19 July 2021 at the age of 83.

Distinctions
Knight of the Legion of Honour (1997)

Books
La Contre-Offensive (1974)
Socialisme à responsabilité limitée : le roi est nu (1981)
La Voie droite (1989)
UNI : 40 ans de combats, 40 affiches (2009)
Ah ! Laissez-nous respirer ! : contre la censure des bien-pensants (2010)

References

1938 births
2021 deaths
Rally for the Republic politicians
Academic staff of Paris-Sorbonne University
Chevaliers of the Légion d'honneur